OGLE-2019-BLG-0960Lb is an exoplanet that was discovered in January 2021. As of March 2021, it is the smallest exoplanet to be detected via microlensing.

References 

Exoplanets detected by microlensing
Exoplanets discovered in 2021